Araeosoma paucispinum is a species of sea urchin of the family Echinothuriidae. Their armour is covered with spines. It is placed in the genus Araeosoma and lives in the sea. Araeosoma paucispinum was first scientifically described in 1924 by Hubert Lyman Clark, an American zoologist.

See also 
 Araeosoma owstoni
 Araeosoma parviungulatum
 Araeosoma splendens

References 

paucispinum
Animals described in 1924